Bolkhovsky District is an administrative and municipal district (raion), one of the twenty-four in Oryol Oblast, Russia. It is located in the north of the oblast. Its administrative center is the town of Bolkhov. Population: 18,041 (2010 Census);  The population of Bolkhov accounts for 63.3% of the district's total population.

Notable residents 

Yevgeni Preobrazhensky (1886–1937), revolutionary, economist and sociologist, born in Bolkhov
Ilya Starinov (1900–2000), military officer, noted Soviet saboteur, born in the village of Voynovo

References

Notes

Sources

Districts of Oryol Oblast